Ustin Cerga (born 25 November 1988, Chișinău, Moldavian SSR) is a Moldavian football goalkeeper who plays for FC Dacia Chișinău.

Club statistics
Total matches played in Moldavian First League: 19 matches - 4 cleansheets

References

External links

Profile at Divizia Nationala
Profile at FC Dacia Chișinău

1988 births
Footballers from Chișinău
Moldovan footballers
Living people

Association football goalkeepers
FC Sfîntul Gheorghe players